Dienvidsusēja (also known as Susēja or Suseja) is a river of Latvia and a right tributary of the river Mēmele. It flows for 114 kilometres. For 4.2 km river forms border between Latvia and Lithuania. River flows through Aknīste town, Nereta village and several smaller settlements.

Tributaries
 Zalvīte (36 km), 
 Radžupe (21 km), 
 Arālīte (21 km).

See also
List of rivers of Latvia

External links

Rivers of Latvia